

The Albatros L 77v was a German tandem two-seat reconnaissance fighter sesquiplane, four examples of which were built under license for Albatros Flugzeugwerke by Ernst Heinkel Flugzeugwerke in 1928. Based upon the L 76 Aeolus reconnaissance trainer, the aircraft was powered by a 450 kW (600 hp) BMW VI 5.5 water-cooled V12 engine.

Like the L 76, the L 77v had a fabric-covered welded-steel fuselage and wooden dual-spar wings with plywood skins supported by N-type struts. It was armed with twin 7.92 mm (.312 in) machine guns in fixed forward-firing positions and a third on a ring mounting in the rear cockpit.

Three of the aircraft saw service performing armament trials in Lipetsk in the Soviet Union; these included one aircraft testing a free-mounted 20 mm cannon. The fourth aircraft had been destroyed while undergoing tests in March 1929. Between December 1929 and their retirement in October 1931, the surviving L 77vs were based at the Staaken Erprobungsstelle (Test Centre).

Specifications (L 77v)

See also

References
 Green, W. & Swanborough, G. (1994). The Complete Book of Fighters. London: Salamander Books. 
 German Aircraft between 1919–1945

Single-engined tractor aircraft
Sesquiplanes
1920s German military reconnaissance aircraft
L 077v
Heinkel aircraft
Aircraft first flown in 1928